Berglind Björg Þorvaldsdóttir (born 18 January 1992), commonly anglicised as Berglind Björg Thorvalsdottir, is an Icelandic professional footballer who plays as a forward for Division 1 Féminine club Paris Saint-Germain and the Iceland national team.

Club career
A prolific goal scorer since youth, Berglind Björg started her professional career at Breiðablik in the Úrvalsdeild kvenna, the women's football top-tier league in Iceland. In 2011, she moved to ÍBV, spending two seasons with the team. From August 2012 until June 2016, Berglind Björg attended the Florida State University in the United States. During this period, she divided her time between playing for Florida State Seminoles and brief stints playing for professional clubs in her native country: first with Breiðablik (2013 and 2014) and later with Fylkir (2015 and 2016). In July 2016, Berglind Björg definitively returned home to play again for Breiðablik. In September 2017, Berglind Björg left Iceland to play for Italy's Serie A club Verona. She had played five matches for the team when the season was halted due to the COVID-19 pandemic.

On 25 August 2022, Paris Saint-Germain announced the signing of Berglind Björg on a two-year deal until June 2024.

International career
Berglind Björg debuted for Iceland U17 on 17 September 2007, in a match against Latvia for the 2008 UEFA Women's Under-17 Championship. She participated in all the six matches Iceland played in the competition. Berglind Björg also represented Iceland at the 2009 UEFA Women's Under-17 Championship. On 24 April 2008 she started to play for the Iceland U19 team. Her first match was against Belgium in the 2008 UEFA Women's Under-19 Championship Qualification. She also represented Iceland at the 2009 UEFA Women's Under-19 Championship, 2010 UEFA Women's Under-19 Championship Qualifying Rounds and 2011 UEFA Women's Under-19 Championship Qualifying Rounds. In 2010, Berglind Björg was called for the 2010 Algarve Cup and debuted in Iceland's first match in the competition on February 24 against the United States. She also represented Iceland at the 2011 Algarve Cup, the 2016 Algarve Cup (when Iceland finished third) and the 2017 Algarve Cup. On 6 April 2017, in a match against Slovakia, she scored her first international goal. On 22 June 2017 she was included by coach Freyr Alexandersson in the squad that represented Iceland at the UEFA Women's Euro 2017.

Personal life
Berglind is the sister of international footballer Gunnar Heiðar Þorvaldsson.

Career statistics

International

Scores and results list Iceland's goal tally first, score column indicates score after each Berglind Björg goal.

References

External links
 
 
 

1992 births
Living people
Berglind Björg Thorvaldsdóttir
Berglind Björg Thorvaldsdóttir
Women's association football forwards
Florida State Seminoles women's soccer players
Berglind Björg Thorvaldsdóttir
Berglind Björg Thorvaldsdóttir
Fylkir women's football players
A.S.D. AGSM Verona F.C. players
PSV (women) players
A.C. Milan Women players
Le Havre AC players
UEFA Women's Euro 2022 players
Berglind Björg Thorvaldsdóttir
Berglind Björg Thorvaldsdóttir
Expatriate women's soccer players in the United States
Berglind Björg Thorvaldsdóttir
Berglind Björg Thorvaldsdóttir
Berglind Björg Thorvaldsdóttir
Expatriate women's footballers in the Netherlands
Expatriate women's footballers in Italy
Expatriate women's footballers in France
UEFA Women's Euro 2017 players